Nico Turoff (Ukrainian: Ніко Турофф; 6 December 1899 – 22 June 1978) was a Ukrainian boxer and actor. He appeared in more than one hundred films from 1926 to 1979.

Selected filmography

References

External links 

1899 births
1978 deaths
Ukrainian male film actors
Ukrainian male silent film actors
People from Kremenchuk
Soviet emigrants to Germany
German male actors